Warwickshire Vision Support (formerly known as Warwickshire Association for the Blind) is a registered charity providing rehabilitation services for adults with sight impairments to support them to live independent lives. Services are provided by Warwickshire Vision Support's rehabilitation team based at their offices in Warwick. In 2014, Warwickshire Association for the Blind changed its operating name to Warwickshire Vision Support. In 2020, the organisation received the prestigious Queen's Award for Voluntary Service.

History

Warwickshire Association for the Blind was founded in 1911, with the objectives of working towards the prevention of blindness and helping blind people in Warwickshire in order to promote their welfare. One of its first tasks was to undertake a survey to determine the number of blind people living in the county. A limited response from parish clergy indicated a number of 250. The inaugural meeting of the Association was chaired by Lord Algernon Percy, the High Sheriff of Warwickshire, and a former Conservative MP, who spoke of the difficulties blind people experienced when finding employment, while other members expressed a need for greater support to equal that which was taking place in other parts of the country.

In 1925, the charity formed a partnership with Warwickshire County Council which saw the appointment of the first home teacher to visit and provide education to blind children throughout the county. With the introduction of the Disabled Persons (Employment) Act 1944, the Association began encouraging able-bodied blind people to register for employment, and by 1945 the charity was operating centers around the county, which at the time included Leamington, Shirley, Sutton Coldfield and Tamworth. The organisation bought Huntley Lodge in Leamington Spa in 1950, turning it into a home for twenty-two elderly blind people. The Lodge was run by Warwickshire County Council until 1980 when it was sold and the proceeds of the sale were donated to the charity.

A 1991 report by the Royal National Institute for the Blind indicated a far greater number of visually impaired people than previously thought, and in response to this, the Association developed a new strategy to cover the increased number of people it would need to provide services for. It also formalised its partnership with Warwickshire Social Services and the task of registering blind and partially sighted people was delegated to the charity.

The Association underwent an extensive restructuring programme in 2004 as a result of changes in financial regulations, and in 2008 became a limited company. As of 2011, Warwickshire Association for the Blind has over 4,000 people on its database; 2,800 of whom are registered as having some form of visual disability. The organisation celebrated its centenary year in 2011 with a re-enactment of its first meeting at Leamington Town Hall. There was also an art exhibition at Leamington Art Gallery.
In 2014, Warwickshire Association for the Blind changed its operating name to Warwickshire Vision Support.

Current services

Help and advice

Warwickshire Vision Support operates a general helpline for members and their carers and families, which offers help and support regarding sight related issues. This includes information on the services that it provides, as well as referrals to other voluntary or statutory organisations if more specific help is required. There is also a Vision Support Desk at Warwick Hospital where patients, staff and members of the public can get advice about eyesight conditions.

Clubs and drop-in centers

Warwickshire Vision Support runs 14 clubs for its members throughout Warwickshire. Meeting on a regular basis (generally bi-monthly) they provide a programme of entertainment and outings. The charity has also established seven drop-in centers to make their facilities and services more accessible to the general public where people can seek advice on anything from services provided by Warwickshire Vision Support to groups in their area to specialist equipment for visually impaired people.

Home Visitor Service

Warwickshire Vision Support provides a home visitor service of volunteers who will call on visually impaired members to help them with reading related tasks. This may be anything from reading newspapers, books or magazines, to helping them with their correspondence.

Rehabilitation and Registration

Warwickshire Vision Support has a team of rehabilitation officers to help people with sight loss adjust to the challenges presented by limited vision. Generally, a team member will visit an individual on a one-to-one basis, either at home or at another designated place, and assess their day-to-day living skills. This can include aspects such as a person's mobility skills, how they cope with day-to-day tasks such as cooking, whether their level of sight causes difficulties with reading, writing or telephone use, and if any low-vision aids are needed. The individual then undergoes a training programme to help them improve their independence skills. Rehabilitation officers also help to determine the level of a person's vision, and whether they should be registered as blind or partially sighted, as well as looking at any possible benefit entitlements. The Rehabilitation Service is provided by Warwickshire Vision Support under contract from Warwickshire County Council, Adult Health & Community Services (formerly Social Services).

Interactive Technology Service

The Interactive Technology Support Service provides an introduction to new digital technology (computers, tablets and smart phones) enabling participants to identify which piece of equipment is best suited to their particular visual impairment and provides training and support in its usage. Demonstrations are designed to challenge reservations about digital technology and the Internet and sensitise people to the opportunities created by new technology. Training is undertaken through structured lessons at Warwickshire Vision Support's Drop-In Centres across Warwickshire with Volunteers providing home-based services to address specific technical support problems.

Shopping Service

Starting in February 2014, the Shoppa Hoppa Service provides transport and sighted guides to support visually impaired people to help with their shopping.  To begin with the service is only available to residents of Warwick District.  The scheme is run in partnership with Back & 4th Community Transport.

My Guide Service

Starting in 2014 the My Guide Service helps visually impaired people to get out of their home and into the local community through the provision of volunteer sighted guides

Talking books and newspapers

The De Montfort Talking Book Service is an independent body which provides books in cassette form for blind and partially sighted people in Warwickshire. Since April 2010 the service has been staffed by volunteers, but was previously a service operated by Warwickshire Vision Support in conjunction with Warwickshire County Council, known as Warwickshire Talking Book Service. Books are provided free of charge to members.

There are several free local talking newspapers available to visually impaired people in the Warwickshire area. These provide local news taken from sources such as newspapers and magazines. In addition, Warwickshire Association for the Blind produces a magazine for its members covering Warwickshire Vision Support-related issues, and other topics of interest. The Warwickshire Vision Support magazine (Warwickshire Vision) is produced three times a year, and is available in large print, braille and audio format.

Visual Impairment Awareness

To help companies and organisations comply with the Disability Discrimination Act, Warwickshire Vision Support provide both formal training and informal talks to organisations and community groups in order to educate people about visual impairment, and to dispel some of the myths surrounding sight loss.

Funding
Although it has received funding from Local Authorities, Warwickshire Vision Support depends upon donations from public, business and foundation sources to fund its work. As much as a third of its income is received from these voluntary sources.

Awards

Queen's Award for Voluntary Service
In June 2020, Warwickshire Vision Support was one of the organisations to receive the Queen's Award for Voluntary Service, the highest award given to a voluntary group in the UK. It was one of two organisations in Warwickshire to receive the award that year.

Awards given by WVS
Each year Warwickshire Vision Support presents awards to individuals and organisations it believes have made a significant contribution to promoting a greater understanding of visual impairment. These include the George Marshall Trophy, awarded to an organisation or individual that has made a considerable contribution to the lives of visually impaired people, and the Viv Bradford Rose Bowl, awarded to an individual who has demonstrated endeavor and achievement to overcome the barriers of visual disability. Recipients of the Viv Bradford trophy include the BBC Radio 4 broadcaster Peter White who was presented with the award in 2002. In 2019 Warwickshire Vision launched the Volunteer Excellence Award to recognize the work of its volunteers.

References

External links

Warwickshire Association for the Blind at Warwickshire.gov.uk

National Association of Local Societies for Visually Impaired People

Disability rights organizations
Blindness organisations in the United Kingdom
Charities based in Warwickshire
Organizations established in 1911
1911 establishments in England